Scorpius X-1 is an X-ray source located roughly 9000 light years away in the constellation Scorpius. Scorpius X-1 was the first extrasolar X-ray source discovered, and, aside from the Sun, it is the strongest apparent source of X-rays in the sky. The X-ray flux varies day-to-day, and is associated with an optically visible star, V818 Scorpii, that has an apparent magnitude which fluctuates between 12-13.

Discovery and early study
The possible existence of cosmic soft X-rays was first proposed by Bruno Rossi, MIT Professor and Board Chairman of American Science and Engineering in Cambridge, Massachusetts to Martin Annis, President of AS&E. Following his urging, the company obtained a contract from the United States Air Force to explore the lunar surface prior to the launch of astronauts to the Moon, and incidentally to perhaps see galactic sources of X-rays.

Subsequently, Scorpius X-1 was discovered in 1962 by a team, under Riccardo Giacconi, who launched an Aerobee 150 sounding rocket carrying a highly sensitive soft X-ray detector designed by Frank Paolini.  The rocket trajectory was slightly off course but still detected a significant emission of soft X-rays that were not coming from the moon. Thus fortuitously, and as first pointed out by Frank Paolini, Scorpius X-1 became the first X-ray source discovered outside the Solar System. The angular resolution of the detector did not initially allow the position of Scorpius X-1 to be accurately determined. This led to suggestions that the source might be located near the Galactic Center, but it was eventually realized that it lies in the constellation Scorpius. As the first discovered X-ray source in Scorpius, it received the designation Scorpius X-1.

The Aerobee 150 rocket launched on June 12, 1962, detected the first X-rays from another celestial source (Scorpius X-1) at J1950 RA  Dec . Sco X-1 is a LMXB in which the visual counterpart is V818 Scorpii.

Although the above reference indicates the rocket launch was on June 12, 1962, other sources indicate the actual launch was at 06:59:00 UTC on June 19, 1962.

Historical footnote:
"The instrumentation had been designed for an attempt to observe X-rays from the moon and was not equipped with collimation to restrict the field of view narrowly. As a result, the signal was very broad, and accurate definition of the size and position of the source was not possible. A similar experiment was repeated in October 1962 when the galactic center was below the horizon and the strong source was not present. A third attempt, in June 1963, verified the results of the June 1962 flight." The Galactic Center is < 20° RA and < 20° Dec from Sco X-1, the two X-ray sources are separated by ~20° of arc and may not have been resolvable in the June 1962 flight.

Scorpius XR-1 has been observed at J1950 RA  Dec .

In 1967 (before the discovery of pulsars), Iosif Shklovsky examined X-ray and optical observations of Scorpius X-1 and correctly concluded that the radiation comes from a neutron star accreting matter from a companion.

Characteristics

Its X-ray output is 2.3×1031 W, about 60,000 times the total luminosity of the Sun. Scorpius X-1 shows regular variations of up to 1 magnitude in its intensity, with a period of around 18.9 hours. The source varies irregularly in optical wavelengths as well, but these changes are not correlated with the X-ray variations. Scorpius X-1 itself is a neutron star whose intense gravity draws material off its companion into an accretion disk, where it ultimately falls onto the surface, releasing a tremendous amount of energy. As this stellar material accelerates in Scorpius X-1's gravitational field, X-rays are emitted. The measured luminosity for Scorpius X-1 is consistent with a neutron star which is accreting matter at its Eddington limit.

This system is classified as a low-mass X-ray binary; the neutron star is roughly 1.4 solar masses, while the donor star is only 0.42 solar masses. The two stars were probably not born together; recent research suggests that the binary may have been formed by a close encounter inside a globular cluster.

See also
 List of X-ray pulsars

References 

Neutron stars
X-ray binaries
Variable stars
Scorpius (constellation)
Astronomical X-ray sources
Scorpii, V818